Elaidius biplagiatus is a species of beetle in the family Cerambycidae, and the only species in the genus Elaidius. It was described by Breuning in 1942.

References

External links

Apomecynini
Beetles described in 1942
Monotypic Cerambycidae genera